Anton Rabtsaw (born 19 February 1984) is a Belarusian former professional footballer.

Honours
Dinamo Minsk
 Belarusian Premier League champion: 2004
 Belarusian Cup winner: 2002–03

External links

1984 births
Living people
Belarusian footballers
FC Dinamo-Juni Minsk players
FC Dinamo Minsk players
FC Darida Minsk Raion players
FC Gomel players
FC Rudziensk players
FC Torpedo-BelAZ Zhodino players
FC Slutsk players
Association football defenders